Sex Secrets of Ancient Atlantis is a novel by John Grant published in 1986.

Plot summary
Sex Secrets of Ancient Atlantis is a narrative featuring sexual revelations about ancient Atlantis.

Reception
Dave Langford reviewed Sex Secrets of Ancient Atlantis for White Dwarf #75, and stated that "The illustrations are sadly all quite printable; the text pokes fun at UFOlogy, the Atlantis myth, magic pendulums, The Tao of Sex, and worse."

References

1986 novels